Prachi Vaishnav is a television actress and model. She is best known for her role as Nisha in serial Amma Ke Babu Ki Baby on Star Bharat (2021-present) and as Poonam in ALTBalaji web series Bang Baang.

Television

Web Shows

Film

References

External links 
 

Indian television actresses
21st-century Indian actresses
Year of birth missing (living people)
Living people